The 2005 World Series was the championship series of Major League Baseball's (MLB) 2005 season. The 101st edition of the World Series, it was a best-of-seven playoff between the American League (AL) champion Chicago White Sox and the National League (NL) champion Houston Astros. The White Sox swept the Astros in four games, winning their third World Series championship and their first in 88 years. The series was played between October 22–26, 2005.

Home field advantage was awarded to Chicago by virtue of the AL's 7–5 victory over the NL in the 2005 MLB All-Star Game. The Astros were attempting to become the fourth consecutive wild card team to win the Series, following the Anaheim Angels (2002), Florida Marlins (2003) and Boston Red Sox (2004). Both teams were attempting to overcome decades of disappointment, with a combined 132 years between the two teams without a title. The Astros were making their first Series appearance in 44 years of play, while the White Sox had waited exactly twice as long for a title, having last won the Series in 1917, and had not been in the Series since 1959, three years before the Astros' inaugural season.

Background

Chicago White Sox

The Chicago White Sox finished the regular season with the best record in the American League at 99–63. The 2005 White Sox led their division wire to wire and only losing 1 game in the postseason. However, the Sox were able to hold off the Cleveland Indians to win the American League Central Division by six games, sweeping Cleveland in three games on the season's final weekend. In the Division Series, the top-seeded White Sox swept the defending champion Boston Red Sox. The League Championship Series began with the second-seeded Los Angeles Angels of Anaheim winning Game 1, but a controversial uncaught third strike in Game 2 helped the Sox start a run and win Games 2–5, all on complete games pitched by starters Mark Buehrle, Jon Garland, Freddy García, and José Contreras, clinching their first American League pennant in 46 years. In game 3 of the ALDS Orlando Hernandez came in with the bases loaded due to Damaso Marte loading the bases with a single and back to back walks. El Duque came in and induced 2 pop outs and a strike out to end the inning and persevere the lead.

Manager Ozzie Guillén then led the White Sox to a World Series victory, their first in 88 years. Slugger Frank Thomas was not on the post-season roster because he was injured, but the team honored his perennial contributions to the franchise during Game 1 of the Division Series against the Boston Red Sox when he was chosen to throw out the ceremonial first pitch. "What a feeling," Thomas said. "Standing all around the place. People really cheering me. I had tears in my eyes. To really know the fans cared that much about me – it was a great feeling. One of my proudest moments in the game."

Houston Astros

The Houston Astros won the Wild Card for the second straight year, once again clinching it on the final day of the season. The Astros embarked on a memorable Division Series rematch against the Atlanta Braves, who were the second seed in the NL. With the Astros in the lead two games to one, the teams played an 18-inning marathon in Game 4, which was the longest (in both time and innings played) postseason game in history. In this game, Roger Clemens made only the second relief appearance of his career, and the first in postseason play. Chris Burke's walk-off home run ended the game in the bottom of the 18th. For the second straight year, the Astros played the top-seeded St. Louis Cardinals in the League Championship Series. Like the White Sox, the Astros dropped Game 1, but were able to regroup and win Games 2–4. With the Astros on the verge of clinching their first ever National League pennant in Game 5, Albert Pujols hit a mammoth three-run home run off Brad Lidge in the top of the ninth inning to take the lead, and subsequently stave off elimination. However, behind NLCS MVP Roy Oswalt, the Astros were able to defeat the Cards 5–1 in Game 6 and earned a trip to the World Series. With the win, this was the Astros' first World Series appearance in franchise history, and the last game played in Busch Stadium II, as it was demolished months after the game and the Cardinals moved to Bucsh Stadium III the next season.

Summary

Matchups

Game 1

Playing in their first World Series home game since 1959, the White Sox took an early lead with a home run from Jermaine Dye in the first inning. After Mike Lamb's home run tied the game in the second, the Sox scored two more in the second when Juan Uribe doubled in A. J. Pierzynski after Carl Everett had already scored on a groundout earlier in the inning. The Astros responded in the next inning when Lance Berkman hit a double, driving in Adam Everett and Craig Biggio. In the White Sox half of the fourth, Joe Crede hit what turned out to be the game-winning home run. In the bottom of the eighth, Scott Podsednik hit a triple with Pierzynski on second off of Russ Springer for an insurance run. Roger Clemens recorded his shortest World Series start, leaving after the second inning with 53 pitches, including 35 for strikes, due to a sore hamstring that he had previously injured (which had caused him to also miss his last regular season start) as the loss went to Wandy Rodríguez. José Contreras pitched seven innings, allowing three runs on six hits for the win. Before exiting, Contreras allowed a leadoff double by Willie Taveras with no outs. Neal Cotts entered the game in the top of the eighth inning. It marked the first time in five games that the White Sox had gone to their bullpen. Cotts pitched  innings before Bobby Jenks was called upon by manager Ozzie Guillén to relieve him. Guillen signaled for the large pitcher by holding his arms out wide and then up high. In the postgame conference, the Sox manager joked that he wanted to be clear he was asking for "The Big Boy." Jenks returned in the ninth to earn the save, giving the White Sox a 1–0 lead in the series.

Game 2

On a cold and rainy evening, Morgan Ensberg's first-pitch home run off starter Mark Buehrle put the Astros on top in the second inning. The White Sox answered in the bottom of the second with two runs off Andy Pettitte on Joe Crede's RBI single with two on and Juan Uribe's sacrifice fly. Houston's Lance Berkman tied the game on a sacrifice fly in the third after a one-out triple, then hit a two-run double in the fifth to give the Astros a 4–2 lead. In the seventh, Dan Wheeler loaded the bases with a double by Juan Uribe, a walk to Tadahito Iguchi, and plate umpire Jeff Nelson's ruling that Jermaine Dye was hit by a pitched ball. The Astros brought in Chad Qualls, who promptly served up a grand slam to Paul Konerko on his first pitch, the 18th grand slam in the annals of the Fall Classic. In the top of the ninth, Sox closer Bobby Jenks blew the save on a game-tying pinch-hit single by José Vizcaíno. In the bottom of the ninth, Astros closer Brad Lidge gave up a one-out, walk-off home run—the 14th in Series history—to Scott Podsednik, giving Lidge his second loss in as many post-season appearances (his previous appearance was in Game 5 of 2005 National League Championship Series). Podsednik had not hit a single homer in the regular season, but this was his second of the post-season. This was the second time in World Series history where a grand slam and a walk-off home run were hit in the same game. The Oakland A's Jose Canseco (grand slam) and the Los Angeles Dodgers' Kirk Gibson (walk-off) in Game 1 of the 1988 World Series were the first to do it. Never before had a World Series grand slam and a World Series walk-off home run been hit by the same team in the same game. Until the grand slam by Adam Duvall of the Atlanta Braves in 2021 World Series, the grand slam by Konerko was the last World Series grand slam hit by the home team.

Game 3

Game 3 was the first World Series game played in the state of Texas. Before the game, it was ruled by Commissioner Bud Selig that the retractable roof would be open at Minute Maid Park, weather permitting. The Astros objected, citing that their record in games with the roof closed was better than with the retractable roof open. Selig's office claimed that the ruling was based on the rules established by Houston and were consistent with how the Astros organization treated the situation all year long, as well as the weather forecasts for that period of time.

The game would become the longest World Series game in length of time (5 hours and 41 minutes) and tied for the longest in number of innings (14, tied with Game 2 of the 1916 World Series and Game 1 of the 2015 World Series) until it was surpassed by Game 3 of the 2018 World Series. Houston struck early on a Lance Berkman single after a Craig Biggio lead-off double in the bottom of the first off Chicago starter Jon Garland. A White Sox rally was snuffed in the second inning; after Paul Konerko hit a leadoff double and A. J. Pierzynski walked, Aaron Rowand lined out into a double play. Houston scored in the third; Adam Everett walked, was caught in a rundown and got hit by the ball on a Juan Uribe throwing error, then scored on a Roy Oswalt sacrifice bunt and a Biggio single. Two batters later, Morgan Ensberg singled Biggio home. Jason Lane led off the Astros' fourth with a home run to left-center field. It was later shown in replays that the ball should not have been ruled a home run, hitting to the left of the yellow line on the unusual wall in left-center field.

The White Sox rallied in the top of the fifth, true to their "Win Or Die Trying" mantra of 2005, starting with a Joe Crede lead-off homer. Uribe, on first after hitting a single, scored on a Tadahito Iguchi base hit with one out, followed by Scott Podsednik coming home on a single by Jermaine Dye. Pierzynski hit a two-out double to Tal's Hill, driving in two runs, scoring Iguchi and Dye giving the Sox the lead. The Astros rallied in the last of the eighth with two outs when Lane's double scored Ensberg with the tying run after back-to-back walks by Ensberg and Mike Lamb, giving Dustin Hermanson a blown save. Houston tried to rally to win in the ninth, but stranded Chris Burke at third, after he had walked, reached second on an error and stolen third.

The Astros tried again in the 10th as well as in the 11th, but failed each time. In the top of the 14th, after the Sox hit into a spectacular double play started by Ensberg, Geoff Blum (a former Astro and the Astros' television color analyst as of 2015), who had entered the game in the 13th, homered to right with two outs off Ezequiel Astacio. Infield singles by Rowand and Crede were followed by walks to Uribe and Chris Widger. Astacio was replaced by Game 1 loser Wandy Rodriguez, who got the final out with the bases loaded. Trailing 7–5, Houston tried to rally with the tying runs on first and third and two outs after a Uribe error. Game 2 starter Mark Buehrle earned the save for winning pitcher Dámaso Marte when Everett popped out, bringing Chicago one game closer to its first championship in 88 years. Buehrle became the first pitcher to start a game in the Series and save the next one since Bob Turley of the Yankees in the 1958 World Series.

Many records were set or tied besides time and innings: The teams combined to use 17 pitchers (nine for the White Sox, eight for the Astros), throwing a total of 482 pitches, and walking 21 batters (a dozen by Chicago, nine by Houston); 43 players were used (the White Sox used 22 and the Astros used 21), and 30 men were left on base (15 for each team), all new high-water marks in Fall Classic history. Scott Podsednik set a new all-time record with eight official at-bats in this game. One tied record was total double plays, with six (four by the Astros, two by the White Sox).

Game 4

Before the game, Major League Baseball unveiled its Latino Legends Team presented by Chevrolet.

The fourth game was the pitchers' duel that had been promised throughout the series. Both Houston starter Brandon Backe and Chicago starter Freddy García put zeros on the scoreboard through seven innings, the longest Series scoreless stretch since Game 7 of the 1991 World Series. Scott Podsednik had a two-out triple in the top of the third, but a Tadahito Iguchi groundout ended that threat. The Astros wasted a chance in the sixth, Jason Lane striking out with the bases loaded. The White Sox in the top of the seventh put runners at second and third, but shortstop Juan Uribe struck out to end the inning. Chicago broke through in the next inning against embattled Houston closer Brad Lidge. Willie Harris hit a pinch-hit single. Podsednik advanced him with a sacrifice bunt. Carl Everett pinch-hit for Iguchi and grounded out to the right side to allow Harris to move to third. Jermaine Dye, the Most Valuable Player of the series, had the game-winning single, driving in Harris.

Things got a little sticky for the Sox in the Astros half of the eighth when reliever Cliff Politte hit Willy Taveras, threw a wild pitch, sending Taveras to second, and walked Lance Berkman. After Morgan Ensberg flew out to center, the White Sox manager Ozzie Guillén brought in Neal Cotts to finish the inning. Cotts induced pinch-hitter José Vizcaíno into a ground out to Uribe. Bobby Jenks, the 24-year-old fireballer, started the ninth inning. He allowed a single to Jason Lane and a sacrifice bunt to Brad Ausmus. Chris Burke came in to pinch-hit; he fouled one off to the left side, but Uribe made an amazing catch in the stands to retire Burke.

The game ended when Orlando Palmeiro grounded to Uribe. As a result, Jerry Reinsdorf, owner of both teams, had won seven championships overall.

This game would be the last postseason game for the Astros as a member of the NL, as they would move to the AL in 2013, and not appear in a postseason game until the 2015 American League Wild Card Game. They also became the only team in the MLB to win both the National and American League pennant after they defeated the New York Yankees in the 2017 ALCS.

The last two Series games technically ended on the same day, Game 3 having concluded after midnight, Houston time.

The 1–0 shutout was the first game with a total of one run scored to end a World Series since the 1995 World Series, in which Game 6 was won by the Atlanta Braves over the Cleveland Indians, and the first 1–0 game in any Series game since Game 5 of the 1996 World Series when the New York Yankees shut-out the Braves in the last game ever played at Atlanta–Fulton County Stadium.

The 2005 White Sox joined the 1995 Atlanta Braves and 1999 New York Yankees as the only teams to win a World Series after losing no more than one game combined in the Division Series and Championship Series. They became the 3rd team in history to lead their division the entire year and sweep the opposition in the world series. Joining the 1927 New York Yankees and the 1990 Cincinnati Reds. The 2005 White Sox will forever be remembered as one of the greatest single season teams in MLB history.

This was the second consecutive World Series to be won by a team that has the word "Sox" in its nickname, after the Boston Red Sox won the 2004 World Series against the St. Louis Cardinals. This also happened in 1917 and 1918. Furthermore, it was the second year in a row in which the Series champions broke a long-lived "curse." In one of those ways that patterns appear to emerge in sporting events, the White Sox World Series win in 2005, along with the Boston Red Sox win in 2004, symmetrically bookended the two teams' previous World Series winners and the long gaps between, with the Red Sox and White Sox last Series wins having come in 1918 and 1917, respectively.

Composite line score

2005 World Series (4–0): Chicago White Sox (A.L.) over Houston Astros (N.L.)

The winning margin of six runs tied for the lowest for a four-game sweep; the only other time was in 1950.

Media

As per their contract, Fox Sports carried the World Series on United States television. Joe Buck provided play-by-play for his eighth World Series while analyst Tim McCarver worked his sixteenth.

ESPN Radio was the nationwide radio broadcaster, as it had been since 1998. Jon Miller and Joe Morgan provided the play-by-play and analysis. Stirring major controversy, ESPN has, on at least two occasions, publicly failed to acknowledge the White Sox as the 2005 World Series champions.

Locally, KTRH-AM and WMVP were the primary carriers for the World Series in the Houston and Chicago markets. For KTRH long time Astros voice Milo Hamilton provided play-by-play while John Rooney called the games for the White Sox. Game 4 was Rooney's last call after 17 years as the radio voice of the White Sox, as he left to take the same position with the St. Louis Cardinals. The Cardinals proceeded to win the 2006 World Series, making Rooney the first home announcer to call back-to-back World Series wins for two teams. That the teams were in two leagues makes the feat even more unusual.

Ratings

The ratings for the 2005 World Series were considered weak.

With an overall average of 11.1, 2005 set a record for the lowest rated World Series of all-time. The prior lowest was 11.9, set by the 2002 World Series between the San Francisco Giants and the Anaheim Angels (importantly, this series went 7 games, and the 2005 Series went 4).

Following the 2005 World Series, however, every subsequent Series through 2013 except for 2009 produced lower ratings. The record-low 2012 World Series, another four-game sweep, averaged 7.6 (3.5 points lower than 2005's rating) and 12.7 million viewers (4.4 million fewer viewers than 2005).

Aftermath
Neither team advanced to the post-season in 2006, but both the White Sox and the Astros were in the Wild Card race until the final weeks of the season, with the White Sox finishing with 90 wins, the Astros with 82 wins. The White Sox made their first post-2005 postseason appearance in 2008, while the Astros would not return to the postseason until 2015, their third season as an American League team and would not return to the World Series until 2017, their fifth season as an American League team. Both teams met in the 2021 American League Division Series, their first match-up in the post-season since the 2005 World Series (and the first since the Astros moved to the AL). Houston won the series 3–1.

This was the city of Chicago's first professional sports championship since the Chicago Fire won MLS Cup '98 (which came four months after the Chicago Bulls' sixth NBA championship that year). The next major Chicago sports championship came in 2010, when the NHL's Chicago Blackhawks ended a 49-year Stanley Cup title drought. However, Houston's 2017 World Series victory became controversial due to the sign stealing scandal that was made public in 2019.

Aaron Rowand and Juan Uribe both won a second World Series title together as members of the  San Francisco Giants.

See also
2005 Asia Series
2005 Japan Series

References

External links

2005 Postseason Schedule at MLB.com 

World Series
World Series
Chicago White Sox postseason
Houston Astros postseason
World Series
World Series
2000s in Chicago
2005 in Illinois
World Series
World Series
Baseball competitions in Chicago
Baseball competitions in Houston